Bronze Cross may  refer to:

 Bronze Cross (Canada) a certification of the Royal Life Saving Society of Canada
 Bronze Cross (Netherlands), of the Netherlands
 Bronze Cross (Philippines), of the Philippines
 Bronze Cross (Scouting), an award of The Scout Association
 Bronze Cross of Rhodesia
 Bronze Cross of Zimbabwe